The 37th parallel south is a circle of latitude that is 37 degrees south of the Earth's equatorial plane. It crosses the Atlantic Ocean, the Indian Ocean, Australasia, the Pacific Ocean and South America.

This parallel approximates that latitude at which solar irradiance equals the planetary average, with higher insolation equatorward and lower poleward.

An exploration of the 37th parallel south is the theme of Jules Verne's novel In Search of the Castaways. The phantom reef of Maria Theresa Reef is supposed to lie on this parallel in the Pacific Ocean.

Around the world
Starting at the Prime Meridian and heading eastwards, the parallel 37° south passes through:

{| class="wikitable plainrowheaders"
! scope="col" width="125" | Co-ordinates
! scope="col" | Country, territory or ocean
! scope="col" | Notes
|-
| style="background:#b0e0e6;" | 
! scope="row" style="background:#b0e0e6;" | Atlantic Ocean
| style="background:#b0e0e6;" |
|-
| style="background:#b0e0e6;" | 
! scope="row" style="background:#b0e0e6;" | Indian Ocean
| style="background:#b0e0e6;" |
|-valign="top"
| 
! scope="row" | 
| South Australia Victoria New South Wales
|-
| style="background:#b0e0e6;" | 
! scope="row" style="background:#b0e0e6;" | Pacific Ocean
| style="background:#b0e0e6;" | Tasman Sea
|-
| 
! scope="row" | 
| North Island – passing through Auckland just north of Auckland Airport (at )
|-
| style="background:#b0e0e6;" | 
! scope="row" style="background:#b0e0e6;" | Pacific Ocean
| style="background:#b0e0e6;" | Hauraki Gulf
|-
| 
! scope="row" | 
| Coromandel Peninsula, North Island – passing through Tairua
|-
| style="background:#b0e0e6;" | 
! scope="row" style="background:#b0e0e6;" | Pacific Ocean
| style="background:#b0e0e6;" |
|-
| 
! scope="row" | 
| Santa María Island
|-
| style="background:#b0e0e6;" | 
! scope="row" style="background:#b0e0e6;" | Pacific Ocean
| style="background:#b0e0e6;" |
|-
| 
! scope="row" | 
| Bío Bío Region – passing through Coronel (at )
|-
| 
! scope="row" | 
| Neuquén ProvinceMendoza ProvinceLa Pampa ProvinceBuenos Aires Province – passing through Pinamar (at )
|-valign="top"
| style="background:#b0e0e6;" | 
! scope="row" style="background:#b0e0e6;" | Atlantic Ocean
| style="background:#b0e0e6;" | Passing just north of the island of Tristan da Cunha, 
|}

See also 
36th parallel south
38th parallel south

References

s37